Šandal is a village and municipality in Stropkov District in the Prešov Region of north-eastern Slovakia.

History
In historical records the village was first mentioned in 1391.

Geography
It has a population of about 300 people.

References

External links
 
 

Villages and municipalities in Stropkov District